Chester Watson may refer to:

 Chester Watson (bass-baritone) (1911–1979), American opera singer
 Chester Watson (cricketer) (born 1938), Jamaican cricketer
 Chester Watson (rapper), American rapper